Hiwarwadi is a village in the Karmala taluka of Solapur district in Maharashtra state, India.

Demographics
Covering  and comprising 156 households at the time of the 2011 census of India, Hiwarwadi had a population of 824. There were 436 males and 388 females, with 82 people being aged six or younger.

References

Villages in Karmala taluka